Fields Creek is a stream in Henry County in the U.S. state of Missouri. It is a tributary of the South Grand River.

The stream headwaters arise just west of Missouri Route 13 between Quarles and Shawnee Mound. The stream flows southwest and passes under Missouri Route 7 and Missouri Route 18 northwest of Clinton. The stream confluence with the South Grand is about three miles west of Clinton.

Fields Creek has the name of Joseph Fields, an early county sheriff.

See also
List of rivers of Missouri

References

Rivers of Henry County, Missouri
Rivers of Missouri